Blues for Walls is an album by jazz pianist/keyboardist Hampton Hawes recorded for the Prestige label in 1973.

Reception

Scott Yanow of Allmusic states, "For a few years (mostly 1972-74), pianist Hampton Hawes spent time exploring electric keyboards. His music became funkier and less distinctive, but his recordings from the era (which are mostly out of print) are certainly quite listenable, if a bit dated in places".

Track listing
All compositions by Hampton Hawes.

 "Blues for Walls" – 7:50   
 "Sun's Dance" – 7:12   
 "Hamp's Collard Green Blues" – 4:10   
 "Brother Brantley" – 4:55   
 "Rain Forest" – 5:17   
 "Carmel" – 5:25   
 "Me-Ho" – 4:37

Personnel
Hampton Hawes – piano, electric piano, synthesizer
Oscar Brashear – trumpet (tracks 1, 2, 4, 5 & 7) 
Hadley Caliman – soprano saxophone, tenor saxophone (tracks 1, 2, 4, 5 & 7) 
George Walker – guitar
Henry Franklin – bass, electric bass 
Ndugu – drums

References

Hampton Hawes albums
1973 albums
Prestige Records albums
Albums produced by Orrin Keepnews